Sharon Sergeant (born 1947) is an American forensic genealogist who specializes in researching and tracing international fraud cases, property settlements, and provenance of artifact collections. She also conducts biographical research for historians, publishers, authors, and journalists. Sergeant attended Northeastern University and received a bachelor's degree from Boston University. She lives in Waltham, Massachusetts.

She was involved in exposing two high profile literary frauds in 2008, Misha Defonseca and Herman Rosenblat.

Career

Sergeant is Director of Programs for the Massachusetts Genealogical Council, and has been an adjunct professor at Boston University, lecturing on problem-solving techniques and technology in genealogy. She is a forensic genealogist at IdentiFinders and owner of AncestralManor.com, and a systems engineering consultant at General Voice and Epodworks. She has worked in the fields of provenance, transportation systems, historical migration patterns, and artificial intelligence applications.

Cases
Sergeant and Colleen Fitzpatrick led the team that exposed as a hoax Misha Defonseca's bestselling book Misha: A Memoir of the Holocaust Years (Surviving with Wolves).

She also worked with the team that exposed Herman Rosenblat's book, Angel at the Fence as a fraudulent account of his time as a concentration camp survivor.

References

External links
 Identifinders International 
 Northeastern University

1947 births
Living people
American genealogists
21st-century American historians